Stephan Leitzinger is a manufacturer of bassoons and bocals based in Hösbach, Germany.
Stephan was an apprentice at Wilhelm Heckel GmbH before working in Paris and then establishing his own business in 1989.

Numerous professional bassoonists play Leitzinger® bassoons.

References

External links

Companies based in Bavaria
German musical instrument makers
Manufacturing companies established in 1989